The Confederation of African Football, or CAF for short, is the administrative and controlling body for association football, futsal and beach soccer in Africa. It was established on 8 February 1957 at the Grand Hotel in Khartoum, Sudan by the national football associations of Egypt, Ethiopia, South Africa and Sudan, following formal discussions between the aforementioned associations at the FIFA Congress held on 7 June 1956 at Avenida Hotel in Lisbon, Portugal.

One of the six continental confederations of world football governing body, FIFA, CAF represents the national football associations of Africa, runs national team and club continental competitions and controls the prize money, regulations and broadcast rights to such competitions. CAF will be allocated 9 spots in the FIFA World Cup starting from 2026 and could have an opportunity of 10 spots with the addition of an intercontinental play-off tournament involving six teams to decide the last two FIFA World Cup places (46+2).

The headquarters of CAF was situated in Khartoum for within the first months of formation until a fire outbreak in the offices of the Sudanese Football Association when the organization was moved near Cairo, Egypt. Youssef Mohamad was the first general secretary and Abdel Aziz Abdallah Salem, the first president. Since 2002, the administrative center is situated in 6th of October City in Cairo, Egypt. CAF currently has 54 member associations which are full members, while Zanzibar and Réunion are associate members (see the CAF Members and Zones section below). The current president is Patrice Motsepe from South Africa, who was elected on 12 March 2021 in an unopposed elections held in Rabat, Morocco.

History

The CAF Anthem 
On 18 September 2017, CAF launched a competition for all African composers to create its anthem without lyrics to reflect the cultural patrimony and the music of Africa.  The chosen anthem, whose composer are to this day unknown and is 74 seconds in length, was first published to the site on 16 January 2008 and it is the entry song for every official CAF competition match. It is also used for every official competition match of the sub-confederations of CAF including WAFU, COSAFA and CECAFA.

Current Leadership

Sources:

Frederick Acheampong, General Coordinator

CAF members and zones

Members

Competitions

CAF competitions

National teams:
Men
Africa Cup of Nations
African Nations Championship
Africa U-23 Cup of Nations
Africa U-20 Cup of Nations
Africa U-17 Cup of Nations
African Schools Championship  
Africa Futsal Cup of Nations
African Youth Olympic Futsal Qualifying Tournament
Africa Beach Soccer Cup of Nations
Women
Women's Africa Cup of Nations
African U-20 Women's World Cup qualification
African U-17 Cup of Nations for Women
African Schools Championship for Girls  

Clubs:
Africa Super League
CAF Champions League
CAF Confederation Cup
CAF Super Cup
CAF Women's Champions League
Defunct
African Cup Winners' Cup
CAF Cup

Inter Continental:
Defunct
Afro-Asian Cup of Nations
Afro-Asian Club Championship
UEFA–CAF Meridian Cup

Regional:
CECAFA Cup
WAFU Nations Cup
Amilcar Cabral Cup
COSAFA Cup
CEMAC Cup
UNIFFAC Cup (U-17)
UNAF U-23 Tournament

International
For men's national teams, the main competition is the Africa Cup of Nations, which began in 1957. In 2009, the CAF began organizing another competition for men's national teams, the African Nations Championship, this time featuring players playing in their respective national leagues. CAF also runs national competitions at Under-20 and Under-17 levels, which also serve as qualification tournaments for the FIFA U-20 World Cup and the FIFA U-17 World Cup respectively.

For women's national teams, CAF operates competitions serving as qualification tournaments for the related FIFA-organized tournaments which launched at the exact same year they began formation. As of 2022, the Women's Africa Cup of Nations, launched in 1991 for senior national teams, qualifies 4 teams to the FIFA Women's World Cup and crowns a champion. Both the African U-20 Women's World Cup qualification tournament, launched in 2002 and the African U-17 Cup of Nations for Women, launched in 2008, each crowns no champion but instead qualifies 2 teams to compete at the FIFA U-20 Women's World Cup and the FIFA U-17 Women's World Cup respectively.

Club
CAF also runs the two main club competitions in Africa: the CAF Champions League, first held in 1964 as the African Cup of Champions Clubs (or just African Cup) and rebranded in 1997 for the champions of African leagues and the runners-up league-finished teams of the top 12 ranked national associations; and the CAF Confederation Cup, launched in 2004 as a merger of the African Cup Winners' Cup, which begun in 1975, and a third competition, the CAF Cup, which started in 1992, for national cup winners and the 3rd-placed league-finished teams of the top 12 ranked national associations.

The CAF Super Cup, which pits the winners of the CAF Champions League against the winners of the CAF Confederation Cup (previously the winners of the African Cup Winners' Cup), was launched in 1993.

The Afro-Asian Club Championship was jointly organized with AFC between the winners of the CAF Champions League and the winners of the AFC Champions League. The last Afro-Asian Club Championship took place in 1998.

The CAF Women's Champions League was founded on 12 September 2020, involving the champions of CAF's sub-confederation qualification tournaments for women's club teams.

Current title holders

Competition Winners

Sponsorship
In October 2004, South African telecommunications giant, MTN, contracted a 4-year deal to sponsor CAF competitions worth US$12.5 million, which was the biggest sponsorship deal in African sporting history at that time.

CAF opened new sponsorship callouts when MTN's contract expired and French telecommunications giant, Orange scooped it up in July 2009, signing an 8-year comprehensive long-term undisclosed deal to sponsor CAF competitions with a value of €100 million.

On 21 July 2016, French energy and petroleum giant, Total S.A., replaced Orange as the main sponsor with an 8-year sponsorship package from CAF for a value of €950 million to support its competitions. Total rebranded as TotalEnergies in 2021, although its sponsorship with CAF continued under the new name.

The current main CAF sponsors are:
1xBet
TikTok
TotalEnergies
Orange

FIFA World Rankings

Overview

Historical leaders

Men's

Women's

Team of the Year

Other rankings

CAF overall ranking of African clubs by titles
The following clubs are the top 10 clubs in CAF competitions.

Update as of 3 August 2022 in chronological order.

By country
The following table lists all the countries whose clubs have won at least one CAF competition. Egyptian clubs are the most successful, with a total of 41 titles. Egyptian clubs hold a record number of wins in the African Cup of Champions Clubs/CAF Champions League (16), the now-defunct African Cup Winners' Cup (8), the CAF Super Cup (12) and the now-defunct Afro-Asian Club Championship (3), followed by Tunisian clubs with 24 titles and they have the most victories in the now-defunct CAF Cup (4). In third place overall, Moroccan clubs have secured 23 titles and they have the most victories in the CAF Confederation Cup (7).

Key

CAF overall ranking of African clubs
Rankings are calculated by the CAF based on points gathered by African teams throughout their participation in international club tournaments organized by either FIFA or CAF since the establishment of the first African Cup of Champions Clubs in 1964.

Men's Futsal
Per 5 April 2022:

a number between brackets is the rank of the previous week.
(*)= Provisional ranking (played at least 10 matches)
(**)= Inactive for more than 24 months

Women's Futsal

Beach soccer national teams
Rankings are calculated by Beach Soccer Worldwide (BSWW). Top ten, last updated 12 March 2018

Major tournament records
Legend
 – Champions
 – Runners-up
 – Third place
 – Fourth place
QF – Quarter-finals (1934–1938, 1954–1970, and 1986–2022: knockout round of 8)
R2 — Round 2 (1974–1978, second group stage, top 8; 1982: second group stage, top 12; 1986–2022: knockout round of 16)
R1 — Round 1 (1930, 1950–1970 and 1986–present: group stage; 1934–1938: knockout round of 16; 1974–1982: first group stage)
Q — Qualified for upcoming tournament
 – Qualified but withdrew
 – Did not qualify
 – Did not enter / Withdrew / Banned
 – Hosts
 – Not affiliated in FIFA

For each tournament, the flag of the host country and the number of teams in each finals tournament (in brackets) are shown.

FIFA World Cup

Firsts
1934:  first African team to qualify for the World Cup
1970:  first African team to draw a match in the World Cup
1978:  first African team to win a match in the World Cup
1982:  first African team to win two matches in the World Cup
1986:  first African team to qualify for two consecutive World Cups
1986:  first African team to reach the knockout stage (round of sixteen)
1990:  first African team to reach the knockout stage (quarter-finals)
1994 and 1998:  first African team to top a group stage and reach the knockout stage (round of sixteen) in two consecutive World Cups
2002:  first African team to reach the knockout stage (quarter-finals) further on the World Cup debut
2010:  first African team to host the World Cup
2014:  &  first African teams to reach the knockout stage (round of sixteen) simultaneously in the World Cup
2022:  first African team to reach the knockout stage (semi-finals), taking the fourth place

FIFA Women's World Cup

Teams are sorted by number of appearances.

Olympic Games For Men

Olympic Games For Women

Africa Cup of Nations

Women's Africa Cup of Nations

FIFA U-20 World Cup

FIFA U-20 Women's World Cup

FIFA U-17 World Cup

Note 1: Original hosts Peru were stripped of the rights to host the 2019 edition in February that year.

FIFA U-17 Women's World Cup

FIFA Futsal World Cup

FIFA Beach Soccer World Cup

Former tournaments

FIFA Confederations Cup

CAF Best Footballers of the Century
The voting to select the best of the century refers to three categories: male player, goalkeeper and female player and is obtained from five different steps. The resulting best players and goalkeepers were honored during the "World Football Gala 1999".

CAF Best Player of the Century

CAF Best Goalkeeper of the Century

CAF Best Women's Footballer of the Century

CAF Golden Jubilee Best Players poll
In 2007, CAF published the list of top 30 African players who played in the period from 1957 to 2007, as part of the celebration of the golden jubilee or 50th anniversary of the foundation of CAF, ordered according to an online poll.

1.  Roger Milla
2.  Mahmoud El Khatib
3.  Hossam Hassan
4.  Samuel Eto'o
5.  Abedi Pele
6.  George Weah
7.  Didier Drogba
8.  Nwankwo Kanu
9.  Rabah Madjer
10.  Kalusha Bwalya
11.  Michael Essien
12.  Augustine Okocha
13.  Saleh Selim
14.  Hacène Lalmas
15.  Benni McCarthy
16.  El Hadji Diouf
17.  Noureddine Naybet
18.  Rashidi Yekini
19.  Hany Ramzy
20.  Hassan Shehata
21.  Lucas Radebe
22.  Tarak Dhiab
23.  Mohammed Timoumi
24.  Anthony Yeboah
25.  Salif Keita
26.  Karim Abdul Razak
27.  Samuel Kuffour
28.  Lakhdar Belloumi
29.  Rigobert Song
30.  Nasr Eddin "Jaksa" Abbas

CAF resolutions

Awards:
CAF Awards
African Footballer of the Year
CAF Clubs of the 20th Century

Qualifications:
CAF 5-Year Ranking

International top goalscorers

This table is for players with 30 or more goals for a CAF national team. Players in bold are still active at international level.

See also

African nations at the FIFA World Cup
Football in Africa
History of CAF

Oceania association football club records and statistics
International Federation of Association Football (FIFA)
Asian Football Confederation (AFC)
Oceania Football Confederation (OFC)
Confederation of North, Central America and Caribbean Association Football (CONCACAF)
Confederation of South American Football (CONMEBOL)
Union of European Football Associations (UEFA)
List of association football competitions
List of association football sub-confederations
List of presidents of CAF
List of first international of African national teams
List of CAF club competition winners
List of CAF club competition winning coaches
List of African national football team managers
Women's football in Africa
List of top international men's football goal scorers by country
List of men's footballers with 50 or more international goals
List of men's footballers with 100 or more international caps

Notes

References

External links

 
Overview of CAF and its competitions via Soccerlens.com
The CAF Anthem since 2007

 
 
Sports organizations established in 1957
Foot
FIFA confederations
1957 establishments in Africa